Mughan (known as Svetlaya Zarya until 2001) is a village and municipality in the Jalilabad District of Azerbaijan. It has a population of 1,852.

References

Populated places in Jalilabad District (Azerbaijan)